The 1987–88 Duke Blue Devils men's basketball team represented Duke University. The head coach was Mike Krzyzewski. The team played its home games in the Cameron Indoor Stadium in Durham, North Carolina, and was a member of the Atlantic Coast Conference.  Duke earned its sixth Final Four appearance in the 1988 NCAA Division I men's basketball tournament, where they suffered a defeat from the Danny Manning-led Kansas Jayhawks by a score of 66-59.

Roster

Schedule

|-
!colspan=9 style=| Regular season

|-
!colspan=12 style=| ACC Tournament

|-
!colspan=12 style=| NCAA Tournament

Rankings

Awards and honors

Team players drafted into the NBA
No one from the men’s basketball team was selected in the 1988 NBA Draft.

References

Duke
Duke Blue Devils men's basketball seasons
NCAA Division I men's basketball tournament Final Four seasons
Duke
1987 in sports in North Carolina
1988 in sports in North Carolina